Valentine Sports Park is an Australian football stadium in Glenwood, a suburb of Sydney.

It is the home of Football NSW. The venue received a $22 million transformation and was officially re-opened in March 2015. The impressive facility features five full-sized football fields all aligned to FIFA specifications, including three natural grass fields and two synthetic fields, all of which have lighting, six player change rooms and a multi-purpose indoor sports centre featuring an international full-sized futsal court.

The main field features grandstand seating for 500 spectators and a grass hill surrounding the pitch, allowing for an estimated capacity of around 4,000. 200 lux lighting allows for semi-professional standards. Valentine Sports Park regularly hosts NPL NSW matches and has hosted international U20 matches and national team trainings in the past.

Prior to the completion of the re-development, the venue was shortlisted to be a training venue for the 2015 Asian Cup.

References

2015 establishments in Australia
Sports venues completed in 2015
Soccer venues in Sydney